Ash-Shurayf is a sub-district located in the Shar'ab as-Salam District, Taiz Governorate, Yemen. Ash-Shurayf had a population of 5,716 according to the 2004 census.

Villages
'Adan Atarus village.
Akmah Hassan village.
Al-'aqibah village.
Al-himsi village.
Al-jabib village.
Banī Kamal village.
Ala'iwar village.
Al-shasirah village.
Al-maqadimah village.
Al-daminah village.
Al-kabsah village.
Jahranuh village.
Alziyla village.
Banī 'Alwaan village.

References

Sub-districts in Shar'ab as-Salam District